Cerje is a village in Croatia. Its name comes from the ancient Croatian word cer — "oak".

Populated places in the City of Zagreb